Esma or ESMA may refer to:

Acronyms
 Escuela Superior Militar de Aviación "Cosme Rennella B." , Ecuadorian Air Force
 Former Escuela Superior de Mecánica de la Armada, used as a detention centre in Argentina 1976–1983, now Navy Petty-Officers School
 Essential Services Maintenance Act, India
 European Securities and Markets Authority, Paris
 European Society for Mathematics and the Arts

Given name
 Esma Agolli (1928–2010), Albanian actress
 Esma Aydemir (born 1992), Turkish middle distance runner
 Esma Cannon (1905–1972), Australian film actor
 Esmâ Ibret Hanim, Ottoman calligrapher and poet
 Esma Nur Çakmak (bırn 2004), Turkish female arm wrestler
 Esma Oniani (1938-1999), Georgian poet, essayist, and painter
 Esma Redžepova (1943-2016), Romani Macedonian vocalist, songwriter, and humanitarian
 Esma Sultan (disambiguation), three Ottoman female sultans
 Fatma Esma Nayman (1899-1967), Turkish politician

Other uses
 Esma Sultana Mansion

Albanian feminine given names
Arabic feminine given names
Turkish feminine given names
Bosnian feminine given names